The Eidsvold class was a class of coastal defence ships, two of which were built for the Royal Norwegian Navy in 1899 by Armstrong Whitworth. Locally they were referred to as panserskip (lit.: armoured ship).

Description
Built as part of the general rearmament in the time leading up to the events in 1905, the two ships of the Eidsvold class remained, along with the slightly older , the backbone of the Norwegian Navy until the German invasion of Norway in 1940. Norge and Eidsvold were the largest vessels in the Norwegian Navy, displacing 4,233 tons and crewed by 270 men.

The Eidsvold class carried a mixed armament, typical of coastal defense ships:
 Two 21 cm (8.26 inch) guns mounted in turrets fore and aft as the main armament
 Six 15 cm (5.90 inch) guns, mounted three on either side in casemates as the secondary armament
 Eight  7.60 cm (3 inch) guns, four mounted in the battery (two on either side) and the remaining four mounted fore and aft
 Four 4.7 cm (1.85 inch / 3-pounder) rapid-fire guns for use against torpedo boats
 Two submerged torpedo tubes

The Eidsvold class was armoured to withstand battle with ships of a similar class, but the underwater armour and internal partitioning were not designed to withstand torpedo hits, which caused both ships' demise:
 6 inches (15.24 cm) of Krupp cemented armour in the belt.
 9 inches (22.86 cm) of the same armour on the main gun turrets.

Ships in class

HNoMS Eidsvold 
 Builder:  Armstrong Whitworth
 Laid down:
 Launched:  June 14, 1900
 Commissioned:
 Operations:  Operation Weserübung
 Victories:  None
 Fate:  Sunk by German destroyer Wilhelm Heidkamp at Narvik on 9 April 1940

HNoMS Norge 
 Builder:  Armstrong Whitworth
 Laid down:
 Launched:  March 1900
 Commissioned:
 Operations:  Operation Weserübung
 Victories:  None
 Fate:  Sunk by German destroyer Bernd von Arnim at Narvik on 9 April 1940

Gallery

Footnotes

References
 

Coastal defense ship classes